Dave Gambee (born February 16, 1937) is an American former basketball player in the National Basketball Association (NBA).

Early life
Gambee attended Corvallis High School in Corvallis, Oregon and starred in basketball and baseball.

College career
Gambee chose to stay in town and play college basketball at Oregon State University. Following the 1957–58 season, the 6-foot-7 Gambee was OSU’s career leader in points scored (1,468), was No. 3 in rebounds (828) and he had five 30-plus scoring games.  Gambee was named an All-American twice while at Oregon State.  He garnered those high honors in 1957 and 1958, and was also a first-team All-Pacific Coast Conference selection both years.  He led the Beavers to the 1958 Pacific Coast Title and to three Far West Classic Championships.  He was the 1957 Classic MVP.  While at Oregon State, Gambee also was a 1st baseman and a pitcher on the Beaver Baseball team as well.

In 2010, Gambee was inducted into the Pac-10 Basketball Hall of Honor.

Professional career
Gambee was drafted by the St. Louis Hawks in the first round (6th pick) of the 1958 NBA draft.  He played 12 seasons in the NBA with eight different teams (10.6 ppg, 5.2 rpg averages), and retired after the 1969–70 season.

NBA career statistics

Regular season

|-
| align="left" | 1958–59
| align="left" | St. Louis
| 2 || - || 3.5 || 1.000 || - || .000 || 1.0 || 0.0 || - || - || 1.0
|-
| align="left" | 1959–60
| align="left" | St. Louis
| 42 || - || 10.6 || .409 || - || .648 || 3.7 || 0.7 || - || - || 5.0
|-
| align="left" | 1959–60
| align="left" | Cincinnati
| 19 || - || 11.1 || .387 || - || .657 || 3.9 || 0.5 || - || - || 5.0
|-
| align="left" | 1960–61
| align="left" | Syracuse
| style="background:#cfecec;"| 79* || - || 26.5 || .419 || - || .827 || 7.4 || 1.3 || - || - || 13.7
|-
| align="left" | 1961–62
| align="left" | Syracuse
| style="background:#cfecec;"| 80* || - || 28.8 || .424 || - || .817 || 7.9 || 1.4 || - || - || 16.7
|-
| align="left" | 1962–63
| align="left" | Syracuse
| 60 || - || 20.6 || .438 || - || .836 || 4.8 || 0.8 || - || - || 11.2
|-
| align="left" | 1963–64
| align="left" | Philadelphia
| 41 || - || 22.6 || .394 || - || .816 || 6.2 || 0.9 || - || - || 11.0
|-
| align="left" | 1964–65
| align="left" | Philadelphia
| style="background:#cfecec;"| 80* || - || 24.9 || .412 || - || .813 || 5.9 || 1.4 || - || - || 12.6
|-
| align="left" | 1965–66
| align="left" | Philadelphia
| 72 || - || 14.8 || .384 || - || .850 || 3.8 || 1.0 || - || - || 6.9
|-
| style="text-align:left;background:#afe6ba;" | 1966–67†
| align="left" | Philadelphia
| 63 || - || 12.0 || .435 || - || .856 || 3.1 || 0.7 || - || - || 6.5
|-
| align="left" | 1967–68
| align="left" | San Diego
| 80 || - || 21.9 || .440 || - || .847 || 5.8 || 1.2 || - || - || 13.4
|-
| align="left" | 1968–69
| align="left" | Milwaukee
| 34 || - || 18.4 || .464 || - || .827 || 5.3 || 0.9 || - || - || 12.1
|-
| align="left" | 1968–69
| align="left" | Detroit
| 25 || - || 12.1 || .423 || - || .790 || 3.1 || 0.6 || - || - || 6.8
|-
| align="left" | 1969–70
| align="left" | San Francisco
| 73 || - || 13.0 || .399 || - || .839 || 3.3 || 0.8 || - || - || 7.2
|- class="sortbottom"
| style="text-align:center;" colspan="2"| Career
| 750 || - || 19.6 || .420 || - || .822 || 5.2 || 1.0 || - || - || 10.6
|}

Playoffs

|-
| align="left" | 1960–61
| align="left" | Syracuse
| 8 || - || 26.0 || .358 || - || .780 || 6.9 || 1.5 || - || - || 12.5
|-
| align="left" | 1961–62
| align="left" | Syracuse
| 5 || - || 34.0 || .315 || - || .880 || 9.0 || 0.8 || - || - || 11.2
|-
| align="left" | 1962–63
| align="left" | Syracuse
| 5 || - || 15.0 || .294 || - || .923 || 3.2 || 0.0 || - || - || 6.4
|-
| align="left" | 1963–64
| align="left" | Philadelphia
| 5 || - || 29.8 || .400 || - || .778 || 5.8 || 1.6 || - || - || 13.8
|-
| align="left" | 1964–65
| align="left" | Philadelphia
| 10 || - || 13.2 || .333 || - || .882 || 2.3 || 0.6 || - || - || 6.2
|-
| align="left" | 1965–66
| align="left" | Philadelphia
| 5 || - || 16.4 || .379 || - || .727 || 2.8 || 0.8 || - || - || 6.0
|-
| style="text-align:left;background:#afe6ba;" | 1966–67†
| align="left" | Philadelphia
| 5 || - || 4.8 || .545 || - || 1.000 || 1.2 || 0.4 || - || - || 3.6
|- class="sortbottom"
| style="text-align:center;" colspan="2"| Career
| 43 || - || 19.5 || .356 || - || .834 || 4.4 || 0.8 || - || - || 8.5
|}

References

1937 births
Living people
All-American college men's basketball players
American men's basketball players
Basketball players from Portland, Oregon
Corvallis High School (Oregon) alumni
Detroit Pistons players
Milwaukee Bucks expansion draft picks
Milwaukee Bucks players
Oregon State Beavers men's basketball players
Philadelphia 76ers players
San Diego Rockets expansion draft picks
San Diego Rockets players
San Francisco Warriors players
Sportspeople from Corvallis, Oregon
St. Louis Hawks draft picks
St. Louis Hawks players
Syracuse Nationals players
Small forwards